Ifenildo Vlijter (born November 17, 1974) is a retired Surinamese footballer who played as a forward for House of Billiards, Robinhood, Inter Moengotapoe and Royal '95 in the Hoofdklasse, and for the Suriname national team.

Club career 
Vlijter began his career in the 1999–2000 Hoofdklasse season, playing for House of Billiards in Paramaribo finishing his first season as the league's joint top goalscorer together with Benny Kejansi (of Inter Moengotapoe) finishing with 24 goals each. The following year he transferred to S.V. Robinhood. Returning to House of Billiards where he remained for two seasons before transferring to Inter Moengotapoe for two seasons, followed by two seasons with Royal '95. In 2007, he returned to Robinhood where he would end his last season as a player as league top scorer once more with 17 goals scored.

International career 
Vlijter has played for the Suriname national team, having made his debut in 2000. He has made 7 official appearances in qualifying campaigns for the FIFA World Cup, CONCACAF Gold Cup and the Caribbean Cup.

Honors

Individual
SVB Hoofdklasse Top Goalscorer (2): 1999–00, 2007–08

References

External links 
 

Living people
1974 births
Sportspeople from Paramaribo
Surinamese footballers
Suriname international footballers
S.V. Robinhood players
Inter Moengotapoe players
SVB Eerste Divisie players
Association football forwards